Novocherkasskaya is a station on the Line 4 of Saint Petersburg Metro, opened on December 30, 1985. Until 1992, it was known as Krasnogvardeyskaya.

References

Saint Petersburg Metro stations
Railway stations in Russia opened in 1985
1985 establishments in the Soviet Union
Railway stations located underground in Russia